Choose Not To Fall is a short film directed by Matthew Marsh, shot by Davidé Hazeldine III, with music from Stephen Schlaägter produced by Mummu. The film discusses the practice of parkour, featuring parkour practitioner Daniel Ilabaca. The film won Best Film from Filminute 2010, gold from the Pepsi Short Film contest and Best 1 minute film from the Azyl Film Festival 2011.

References

External links

2010 films
2010 short documentary films